UFC 61: Bitter Rivals was a mixed martial arts event held by the Ultimate Fighting Championship on Saturday, July 8, 2006. The event took place at the Mandalay Bay Events Center, in Las Vegas, Nevada and was broadcast live on pay-per-view in the United States.

Background
The main event was a Heavyweight Championship match between champion Tim Sylvia and former champion Andrei Arlovski. This was the third time these fighters had met, they had split the first two meetings. The co-main event was the highly anticipated rematch of TUF 3 coaches Tito Ortiz and Ken Shamrock.

It was announced during the event that Chuck Liddell would fight PRIDE star Wanderlei Silva in November if Liddell won his upcoming match against Renato "Babalu" Sobral at UFC 62. Negotiations between the UFC and PRIDE failed however and the Liddell-Silva fight never occurred in November 2006. The two would eventually meet in December 2007 at UFC 79.

The number of pay-per-view buys for UFC 61 in the United States was approximately 775,000, which set a new UFC buyrate record and generated gross PPV revenue of approximately $30,960,000. The disclosed fighter payroll for the event was $686,000. With a live gate at $3,350,775, it nearly eclipsed the all-time mark for UFC events set at UFC 57.

Results

Bonus awards
Fight of the Night: Joe Stevenson vs. Yves Edwards
Knockout of the Night: Jeff Monson
Submission of the Night: Hermes Franca

Reported payouts

Tito Ortiz: $210,000

Tim Sylvia: $120,000

Ken Shamrock: $100,000

Andrei Arlovski: $90,000

Frank Mir: $56,000

Joe Stevenson: $24,000

Jeff Monson: $20,000

Drew Fickett: $12,000

Josh Burkman: $10,000

Yves Edwards: $8,000

Hermes Franca: $8,000

Cheick Kongo: $6,000

Josh Neer: $6,000

Dan Christison: $5,000

Joe Jordan: $4,000

Anthony Perosh: $3,000

Kurt Pellegrino: $2,000

Gilbert Aldana: $2,000

Disclosed Fighter Payroll: $686,000

See also
 Ultimate Fighting Championship
 List of UFC champions
 List of UFC events
 2006 in UFC

References

Sources
Mixed martial arts show results, Mandalay Bay, July 8, 2006 (PDF), Nevada State Athletic Commission. Retrieved July 13, 2006.
UFC Fighter Salaries for 2006 (includes fighter salaries for UFC 61)
UFC 61 Surpasses $30 Million in Pay-Per-View Sales
https://www.fightopinion.com/2006/07/20/ufc-61-payouts/ UFC 61 payouts

External links
UFC 61 card
UFC 61 website

Ultimate Fighting Championship events
2006 in mixed martial arts
Mixed martial arts in Las Vegas
2006 in sports in Nevada